USDC may refer to:

 United States Department of Commerce
 United States Diplomacy Center
 United States district court
 Universal Scene Description, .usdc (binary-encoded) file format
 Ultrasonic/sonic driller/corer
 USD Coin, a stablecoin cryptocurrency